The Right Reverend James Murray  D.D. (25 March 1828 – 9 July 1909) was a Roman Catholic bishop, the first resident Bishop of the diocese of Maitland in New South Wales, Australia.

Background
Murray was born in County Wicklow, Ireland, the son of James Murray, a farmer, and his wife Catherine, née Doyle. He was related to Daniel Murray, Archbishop of Dublin and Primate of Ireland.

James junior was educated at the Propaganda College at Rome, where he remained from his fourteenth to his twenty-fourth year (1852), when he was admitted to the priesthood. He then returned to Dublin. From 1854 to 1865 he served as private secretary to Cardinal Paul Cullen.

Career in Australia
On 14 November 1865 in Dublin, Murray was consecrated first Bishop of Maitland, (when his cousin Matthew Quinn was also consecrated Bishop of Bathhurst) by Cardinal Cullen. In October 1866 he landed in New South Wales. After taking possession of the see, the ecclesiastical and educational development of the diocese under his auspices were enormous. He introduced the Dominican nuns to Australia in 1867; and the Brigidines in 1883. Murray visited Europe in 1871; and on a second trip in 1881 secured for his diocese a community of Redemptorist missionaries.

Murray's health began to worsen by the mid-1890s and in 1897 he chose Patrick Vincent Dwyer, his protégé, as coadjutor bishop. He celebrated his golden jubilee as a priest in 1902.

References

Roman Catholic bishops of Maitland-Newcastle
19th-century Roman Catholic bishops in Australia
Irish expatriate Catholic bishops
1828 births
1909 deaths